The Fable of Elvira and Farina and the Meal Ticket is a 1915 silent film directed by Richard Foster Baker. Gloria Swanson made her first credited appearance in this film as Farina.

Cast
 Lillian Drew - Elvira
 Gloria Swanson - Farina, Elvira's Daughter (as Gloria Mae Swanson)
 Rapley Holmes - The Meal Ticket
 Gerda Holmes

References

External links

1915 films
American silent short films
1915 comedy films
1915 short films
American black-and-white films
Essanay Studios films
Silent American comedy films
American comedy short films
1910s American films
1910s English-language films